Matthew Davis Hensley (born August 18, 1978) is a former professional baseball pitcher. He played part of the 2004 season in Major League Baseball for the Anaheim Angels.

In 2004, Hensley appeared in 30 games for the Angels, in which he went 0-2 with a 4.88 ERA and 30 strikeouts. In 2008, he played for the independent Southern Maryland Blue Crabs of the Atlantic League. On July 20, 2009, Hensley's contract was purchased by the Toronto Blue Jays organization, but he was released on August 19 after appearing in just eight games for the New Hampshire Fisher Cats.

References

External links

Major League Baseball pitchers
Anaheim Angels players
Butte Copper Kings players
Cedar Rapids Kernels players
Lake Elsinore Storm players
Rancho Cucamonga Quakes players
Salt Lake Stingers players
Salt Lake Bees players
Arizona League Angels players
Grossmont Griffins baseball players
Southern Maryland Blue Crabs players
New Hampshire Fisher Cats players
Baseball players from California
1978 births
Living people